123456 is a number. It can refer to:

 123456 (password), a common password
 "123456" (song), by Fitz and the Tantrums from the album All the Feels
 Braille pattern dots-123456
 123456, or 12
 3 456, a typical example of specifying a six-digit vehicle license plate number, for instance, as with United States license plate designs and serial formats

References